Sycamore Valley is a historic tobacco plantation house and national historic district located near Grassy Creek, Granville County, North Carolina.  The original section of the house was built about 1825.  The eight bay frame house consists of a two-story, central block flanked by lower two-story wings.  It includes Greek Revival and Georgian / Federal style design elements.  Also on the property are the contributing smokehouse, dairy barn, log tobacco barn, a stable, chicken house, corn crib, an packhouse.

It was listed on the National Register of Historic Places in 1988.

References

Tobacco in the United States
Plantation houses in North Carolina
Farms on the National Register of Historic Places in North Carolina
Historic districts on the National Register of Historic Places in North Carolina
Georgian architecture in North Carolina
Federal architecture in North Carolina
Greek Revival houses in North Carolina
Houses completed in 1825
Houses in Granville County, North Carolina
National Register of Historic Places in Granville County, North Carolina